The Igor I. Sikorsky Human Powered Helicopter Competition was established in 1980 by the American Helicopter Society (AHS) International. The award, the AHS Sikorsky Prize, was given for the first human powered helicopter (HPH) to meet a set of extremely challenging flight requirements.

In 2013, 33 years after the competition was established, the award was officially declared won when AeroVelo's Atlas human-powered helicopter conducted a flight that met all the requirements of the AHS International competition, and received the $250,000 prize.

In the history of the prize, dozens of teams have designed and built human-powered helicopters, although few have made it airborne.

History

The AHS competition was named in honor of Igor Sikorsky, one of the founders of the technical society. AHS initiated the prize purse at $25,000, but later raised it to $250,000.

The first HPH to get off the ground was the Da Vinci III in 1989, designed and built by students at Cal Poly San Luis Obispo in California, USA. The second was the Yuri I in 1994, designed and built by students at Nihon University in Japan. It flew for 19.46 seconds and reached an altitude of 20 cm.

With no human-powered helicopter getting off the ground since 1994, in 2009 Sikorsky Aircraft Corporation pledged to AHS International an increase in the size of the remuneration to $250,000, which significantly increased interest in the competition. It resulted in a new generation of human-powered helicopter teams, with two—one the University of Maryland and the other AeroVelo—in a "tight battle" to win.

Students at the University of Maryland designed and built the Gamera I.  The Gamera I successfully flew on May 12, 2011 for approximately four seconds, soon followed by a flight of 11 seconds. In November 2011 construction began on the improved Gamera II. On June 21, 2012, the Gamera II flew for a duration of 50 seconds. Additional tests of Gamera IIXR with a larger cruciform and longer rotors on August 28, 2012 yielded official world records of 65 seconds endurance on one flight and 8  ft altitude on another – the first "high altitude" flight of a human-powered helicopter in history, and the first of the individual requirements to fall.

NTS Works later donated the aircraft to the California Polytechnic State University which is developing it as the Upturn II.

Winner

AeroVelo, comprising students and graduates of the University of Toronto, began flight testing its larger Atlas quad rotor HPH on August 28, 2012.

On 13 June 2013 AeroVelo kept its Atlas HPH airborne for 64.11 seconds, reaching 3.3 meters in altitude and drifting less than 9.8 meters. AHS International awarded AeroVelo the prize July 11, after its Helicopter Competition Committee reviewed the flight data.

See also

 List of aviation awards
 List of engineering awards
 Kremer prize
 Prizes named after people

References

External links
Igor I. Sikorsky Human Powered Helicopter Competition – AHS International
humanpoweredhelicopters.org – lists attempts to win the AHS Prize

Awards established in 1980
Aerospace engineering awards
Human-powered aircraft
Aviation awards